Manal Kayiru is a 1982 Indian Tamil-language comedy drama film written and directed by Visu in his directorial debut. The film stars S. Ve. Shekher and Shanthi Krishna, with Visu, Manorama, Kishmu and Kuriakose Ranga portraying supporting roles. It is based on Visu's play Modi Masthan. The film was remade in Kannada as Savira Sullu, in Telugu as Pelli Chesi Chupistham and in Malayalam as Thiruthalvaadi (with the ending changed). A sequel, Manal Kayiru 2, was released in 2016 with Shekar, Visu, and Ranga reprising their roles.

Plot 
Kittumani lays down eight conditions which the girl he marries should fulfill. His uncle Naradar Naidu is fed up with seeking a girl for him. The eight conditions are as follows-
 As Kittumani is a B.sc, she should have started studying, but should have left off in between.
 (condition # 1(a)) She should know Hindi as his company has branches in Hindi-speaking cities.
 She should look pretty only to Kittumani, but not to anyone else.
 She should be bold to withstand thieves, kidnappers, etc.
 She should never weep for any reason.
 She should cook both veg and Non-veg as he is a vegetarian and his best friend is a non-vegetarian.
 As he can play Mridangam, she should know how to dance to it.
 Their secrets should be known to each other, but not to anyone else.
 After Kittumani's death, she should remarry and live happily.

At last, Naradar Naidu finds a girl who is very nice, but unfortunately doesn't fulfill any condition. After some zig-zag work, he arranges their marriage. After four days, Kittumani finds that not a single condition has been fulfilled. He plans to send her out of his house, but Naidu, who pretends to support Kittumani, stops him. Later they realise that she is pregnant with Kittumani's child. After his sister is expelled from her husband's house as per Naidu's instructions and his wife is learning and speaking Hindi, Kittumani agrees to let her stay with him. He also has his own selfish reasons as he experiences much trouble cooking. At last they all convince, but Naidu is thrown out of the house as he is said to be the only reason behind the confusion. Naidu reveals that he did this as he, like Kittumani, had placed conditions which should be fulfilled by his fiancée and just before the marriage, he discovered that some conditions had not been fulfilled. The girl had killed herself and from then, Naidu had pledged to save people's lives from these types of issues.

Cast 
 S. Ve. Shekher as Kittumani
 Shanthi Krishna as Uma
 Visu as Naradhar Naidu
 Manorama as Durga
 Kishmu as Kamalakannan
 M. R. Rajamani as Manickam Pillai
 Kamala Kamesh as Uma's mother
 Kuriakose Ranga as Lakshmanaswamy and Ramaswamy
 Boopathy as Thangappan

Production 
Manal Kayiru is the directorial debut of Visu, and was adapted from his own play Modi Masthan. Maadhu Balaji was initially offered the lead role, but could not accept since his mother gave him permission to act only in stage plays. The role of the character, Kittumani, later went to S. Ve. Shekher.

Soundtrack 
Soundtrack was composed by M. S. Viswanathan and lyrics by Vaali.

Reception 
S. Shivakumar of Mid-Day gave a negative review citing the film "is full of inane situations with double meaning, taking unnecessary digs at politicians and crude insinuations at vulgarity" and also criticised the photography as "uniformly bad" and M. S. Viswanathan's music as "jarring and harsh on the ears". Manjula Ramesh of Kalki criticised Shekher for not being able to emote his anger without making her laugh, but appreciated Visu's acting the most of the cast.

Sequel 
The 2016 sequel for the film has Shekar, Visu, and Kuriakose Ranga reprising their roles, with Shekar's son Ashwin portraying the lead role.

References

External links 

1980s Tamil-language films
1982 comedy-drama films
1982 directorial debut films
1982 films
Films about Indian weddings
Films directed by Visu
Films scored by M. S. Viswanathan
Films with screenplays by Visu
Indian comedy-drama films
Indian films based on plays
Tamil films remade in other languages